Arababad (also Romanized as ‘Arabābād; also known as ‘Arabābād-e Afshār) is a village in Hiv Rural District, in the Central District of Savojbolagh County, Alborz Province, Iran. At the 2006 census, its population was 516, in 147 families.

References 

Populated places in Savojbolagh County